KZPI (91.7 FM) was a radio station broadcasting a Spanish music format. Licensed to Deming, New Mexico, United States, the station was owned by Paulino Bernal Evangelism. KZPI's license was returned to the Federal Communications Commission (FCC) by the licensee on June 21, 2013, and then cancelled by the FCC on June 26, 2013.

References

External links
 

ZPI
Radio stations established in 1992
Radio stations disestablished in 2013
Defunct radio stations in the United States
Defunct religious radio stations in the United States
1992 establishments in New Mexico
2013 disestablishments in New Mexico
ZPI